"Thank God" is a song by American country music singer Kane Brown. It is a duet with his wife, Katelyn Brown. It was released on September 12, 2022 as the fourth single from Kane Brown's third studio album Different Man.

Content and history
Christian Davis, Kyle Fishman, Jaxson Free, Josh Hoge, and Jared Mullins composed the song. According to Kane Brown, he was recommended the song by Hoge, who is a friend of his. Upon listening to the demo, Brown chose to include his wife Katelyn as a duet vocalist. Katelyn had been a contemporary R&B musician prior to marrying him in 2019, but had not been featured on any of his songs prior.

An uncredited review in Music Mayhem described the song as having "beautiful harmonies" between the Browns. E! Online described the song as having a theme of how "grateful" the two are to be in love with each other.

The week of the song's release, it debuted on multiple Billboard charts dated for the week ending September 24, 2022. It entered the Billboard Hot 100 at number 22, Hot Country Songs at number 5, and ascended from number 49 to 35 on Country Airplay. According to Billboard data for this week, the song was streamed over eleven million times, and was the most-added song to country radio playlists. Upon doing so, it became the first chart entry for Katelyn, as well as the highest charting country song by a married couple since "Chasing After You" by Ryan Hurd and Maren Morris in 2021. It later reached number one on the Country Airplay chart in February 2023, making it the second duet by a married couple to top the chart, following Tim McGraw and Faith Hill's "It's Your Love" in 1997.

In addition to this, Brown released a music video, directed by Alex Alvga.

Charts

Weekly charts

Year-end charts

References

2022 songs
2022 singles
RCA Records Nashville singles
Kane Brown songs
Songs written by Josh Hoge
Song recordings produced by Dann Huff
Male–female vocal duets
Country ballads